Timothy Lee Toone (born February 14, 1985) is a former American football wide receiver. He was drafted by the Detroit Lions with the final pick (255th overall) of the 2010 NFL Draft, earning the title of Mr. Irrelevant. He played two years of NCAA Division I FCS college football at Weber State in Ogden, Utah.

College career
After serving a two-year mission to West Africa for the Church of Jesus Christ of Latter-day Saints, Toone began a four-year college football career with the Weber State Wildcats.

In his first Wildcats season, Toone had more punt returns (10) than catches (7) but had 275 yards and 2 touchdowns receiving with 95 yards and a touchdown returning punts. He finished with an average of 39.28 yards per reception (34.37 yards per game).

Toone had a more productive season as a wide receiver in his second season with 32 catches, 698 yards, and 10 touchdowns, having started all 11 games for the Wildcats (12 of 19 games started in his two seasons). He averaged 63.45 yards per game (21.81 yards per reception and 2.9 receptions per game) and had 10 touchdowns.

Heading into the 2010 NFL Draft, Toone finished his college career with 1,100 total yards (973 receiving and 127 punt returning) and 13 touchdowns (12 receiving and 1 punt return). In his March 2010 Pro Day, Toone posted a 4.42 second 40-yard dash time and a vertical jump of 36 inches.

Professional career

Detroit Lions
Toone was the 255th and final selection of the 2010 NFL Draft by the Detroit Lions, thus earning the moniker Mr. Irrelevant. On September 4, 2010, Toone was one of the final cuts as Detroit reduced its roster to the 53-man limit.  However, the Lions re-signed Toone to their practice squad the next day.

Toone was placed on the practice squad's injured reserve due to an undisclosed injury on October 7, 2010. He was re-signed to a future contract on January 5, 2011. Toone was waived during final cuts on September 3, and re-signed to the Lions' practice squad on September 21. The Detroit Lions released Toone again on September 27, 2011.

Buffalo Bills
On October 11, 2011, the Buffalo Bills signed Toone to their practice squad.

Denver Broncos
On January 10, 2012, the Denver Broncos signed Toone to the practice squad. Toone was waived on April 30, 2012.

Atlanta Falcons
Toone was signed by the Atlanta Falcons on July 25, 2012. He made the 53-man roster for the first time. He was cut on September 6, 2012, due to a hamstring pull, but later re-signed on November 13, 2012. On July 23, 2013, Toone was waived by the Atlanta Falcons.

New Orleans Saints
On July 30, 2013, Toone was signed by the New Orleans Saints. On August 27, 2013, he was waived by the Saints.

Post-playing career
As of 2020, Toone works as an ICU nurse in Arizona.

References

External links
Weber State Wildcats bio
Atlanta Falcons bio

1985 births
Living people
People from Peoria, Arizona
Sportspeople from the Phoenix metropolitan area
Players of American football from Arizona
American football wide receivers
Weber State Wildcats football players
Detroit Lions players
Atlanta Falcons players
New Orleans Saints players
Buffalo Bills players
Denver Broncos players
American Mormon missionaries
Latter Day Saints from Arizona
Mormon missionaries in Africa